The one-toothed shew mouse (Pseudohydromys ellermani) is a species of rodent in the family Muridae. It is found in West Papua, Indonesia and Papua New Guinea, at elevations from 1,200 to 3,000 m. It is most closely related to Pseudohydromys germani.

References

Pseudohydromys
Rodents of Papua New Guinea
Mammals of Western New Guinea
Mammals described in 1954
Taxa named by John Edwards Hill
Taxonomy articles created by Polbot
Taxa named by Eleanor Mary Ord Laurie
Rodents of New Guinea